The 1955 Duke Blue Devils football team represented the Duke University as a member of the Atlantic Coast Conference (ACC) during the 1955 college football season.

Schedule

References

Duke
Duke Blue Devils football seasons
Atlantic Coast Conference football champion seasons
Duke Blue Devils football